Brickell is a surname. Notable people with the surname include:

 Antonia Brickell, British radio personality
 Barry Brickell (1935–2016), New Zealand potter and writer
 Butch Brickell (1957–2003), American racing driver 
 Edie Brickell (born 1966), American singer-songwriter
 Fred Brickell (1906–1961), American baseball player
 Fritz Brickell (1935–1965), American baseball player
 Richard Brickell (born 1975), British sport shooter
 William Brickell (1817–1908), American businessman and city founder

See also
 Brickell Avenue, Miami, Florida
 Brickell Key, a man-made island in Miami
 Brickell station, a rapid transit station in Miami
 Brickell Magazine